Wambui is a name of Kikuyu origin that may refer to:
Wambui Ngugi, member of the Kenyan African pop group Elani
Wambui Otieno (1936–2011)), Kenyan activist, politician and writer
Beth Wambui Mugo (born 1959), Kenyan politician
Joyce Wambui Njuguna (born 1976), Kenyan powerlifter
Lucy Wambui Murigi (born 1985), Kenyan female mountain runner
Margaret Wambui (born 1995), Kenyan middle-distance runner
Mary Wambui, Kenyan businesswoman and politician
Nancy Wambui (born 1986), Kenyan long-distance runner

Kenyan names